Akbarabad (also Romanized as Akbarābād) is a village in Zeydabad Rural District, in the Central District of Sirjan County, Kerman Province, Iran. At the 2006 census, its population was 372, in 85 families.

References 

Populated places in Sirjan County